Kōkoku (興国) was a Japanese era of the Southern Court during the Era of Northern and Southern Courts after Engen and before Shōhei, lasting from April 1340 to December 1346.

Nanboku-chō overview

During the Meiji period, an Imperial decree dated March 3, 1911, established that the legitimate reigning monarchs of this period were the direct descendants of Emperor Go-Daigo through Emperor Go-Murakami, whose  had been established in exile in Yoshino, near Nara.

Until the end of the Edo period, the militarily superior pretender-Emperors supported by the Ashikaga shogunate had been mistakenly incorporated in Imperial chronologies despite the undisputed fact that the Imperial Regalia were not in their possession.

This illegitimate  had been established in Kyoto by Ashikaga Takauji.

Change of era

 Northern Court Equivalents: Ryakuō; Kōei; Jōwa

Events of the Kōkoku Era
 1342 (Kōtoku 3): Ichijō Tsunemichi loses his position as kampaku; and he is replaced by Kujō Michinori.
 1342 (Kōtoku 3):  is removed from his position as daijō daijin.
 1342 (Kōtoku 3): Kujō Michinori is replaced by Takatsukasa Morohira, who was formerly udaijin.
 1342 (Kōtoku 3): Fujiwara no Kiyoko dies. She was the daughter of Usesugi Yorishige and the mother of Ashikaga Takauji.
 1343 (Kōtoku 4): Nijō Yoshimoto, the author of Masukagami, was promoted from the court position of nadaijin to udaijin; and in due course, the udaijin was promoted to sadaijin. The dainagon was promoted to nadaijin.
 1344 (Kōtoku 4): Shōgun Takauji offered prayers at Iwashimizu Hachiman-gū.

Notes

References
 Mehl, Margaret. (1997). History and the State in Nineteenth-Century Japan. New York: St Martin's Press. ; OCLC 419870136
 Nussbaum, Louis Frédéric and Käthe Roth. (2005). Japan Encyclopedia. Cambridge: Harvard University Press. ; OCLC 48943301
 Thomas, Julia Adeney. (2001). Reconfiguring Modernity: Concepts of Nature in Japanese Political Ideology. Berkeley: University of California Press. ; 
 Titsingh, Isaac. (1834). Nihon Odai Ichiran; ou,  Annales des empereurs du Japon.  Paris: Royal Asiatic Society, Oriental Translation Fund of Great Britain and Ireland. OCLC 5850691

External links
 National Diet Library, "The Japanese Calendar" -- historical overview plus illustrative images from library's collection

Japanese eras
1340s in Japan